Oscar Valicelli (1 July 1915 – 11 October 1999) was an Argentine film actor.

Filmography
 La Mary (1974) dir. Daniel Tinayre  …Ubaldo
 Balada para un mochilero (1971) dir. Carlos Rinaldi   …El Moncho
 Desnuda en la arena (1969) dir. Armando Bo
 Fuego (1968) dir. Armando Bo …Mecánico
 Carne (1968) dir. Armando Bo …Jacinto
 La señora del intendente (1967) dir. Armando Bo …Policía
 La tentación desnuda (1966) dir. Armando Bo …Junquero 1
 Pesadilla (1963) dir. Diego Santillán …Enfermero
 La cigarra no es un bicho (1963) dir. Daniel Tinayre  
 El rufián (1961) dir. Daniel Tinayre  …Ángel
 Luna Park (1960) dir. Rubén W. Cavallotti  
 Los torturados (1956) dir. Alberto Dubois  …Raúl
 Estrellas de Buenos Aires (1956) dir. Kurt Land  
 La bestia humana (1954) dir. Daniel Tinayre  …Amigo de Pedro
 Mujeres en sombra (1951) dir. Catrano Catrani  
 Sacachispas (1950) dir. Jerry Gómez  
 Campeón a la fuerza (1950) dir. Juan Sires y Enrique Ursini
 Diez segundos (1949) dir. Alejandro Wehner y Carlos D'Agostino
 Vidalita (1948) dir. Luis Saslavsky
 Modern Husbands (1948) dir. Luis Bayón Herrera
 El que recibe las bofetadas (1947) dir Boris H. Hardy …Alfredo
 Éramos seis (1945) dir. Carlos Borcosque  
 Llegó la niña Ramona (1943) dir. Catrano Catrani  
 Su hermana menor (1943) dir. Enrique Cahen Salaberry  
 Malambo (1942) dir. Alberto de Zavalía  
 Ceniza al viento (1942) dir. Luis Saslavsky
 Vacaciones en el otro mundo (1942) dir. Mario Soffici
 Cada hogar, un mundo (1942) dir. Carlos Borcosque  
 La maestrita de los obreros (1942) dir. Alberto de Zavalía  
 Soñar no cuesta nada (1941) dir. Luis César Amadori  
 Mother Gloria (1941) dir Richard Harlan
 When the Heart Sings (1941) dir Richard Harlan…Pedrito
 Nosotros... los muchachos (1940) dir. Carlos Borcosque  
 Los ojazos de mi negra (1940) dir. Eduardo G. Ursini
 Cita en la frontera (1940) dir. Mario Soffici
 Con el dedo en el gatillo (1940) dir. Luis Moglia Barth…Américo
 Fragata Sarmiento (1940) dir. Carlos Borcosque  
 ...Y mañana serán hombres (1939) dir. Carlos Borcosque  …Lorenzo Fernández, "El Loro"
 Atorrante (La venganza de la tierra)  (1939) dir. Enrique de Rosas
 Alas de mi patria (1939) dir. Carlos Borcosque  
 Mandinga en la sierra (1939) dir. Isidoro Navarro
 Murió el sargento Laprida (1937) dir. Tito Davison…Antoñito

References

Argentine male film actors
1915 births
1999 deaths
20th-century Argentine male actors